Timasitheus was an athlete of Delphi, who was victorious several times in the pankration at the Olympic and Pythian Games, and was also distinguished as a brave soldier.

Background
He was one of the partisans of the Athenian archon Isagoras when they seized the Acropolis with the help of Cleomenes I. The citadel was besieged by the Athenians, and Timasitheus was one of those who fell into their hands, and was put to death.  Pausanias mentions a statue of Timasitheus at Olympia, the work of Ageladas the Argive.

References

6th-century BC Greek people
Pankratiasts
People from Delphi
Executed ancient Greek people
Ancient Olympic competitors
Ancient Pythian athletes
6th-century BC executions
People executed by ancient Athens
Year of birth unknown